was a Japanese historical novelist. Among his best-known novels are revisions of older classics. He was mainly influenced by classics such as The Tale of the Heike, Tale of Genji, Water Margin and Romance of the Three Kingdoms, many of which he retold in his own style. As an example, Yoshikawa took up Taiko's original manuscript in 15 volumes to retell it in a more accessible tone and reduce it to only two volumes. His other books also serve similar purposes and, although most of his novels are not original works, he created a huge amount of work and a renewed interest in the past. He was awarded the Cultural Order of Merit in 1960 (the highest award for a man of letters in Japan), the Order of the Sacred Treasure and the Mainichi Art Award just before his death from cancer in 1962. He is cited as one of the best historical novelists in Japan. The complete translation of his "Miyamoto Musashi", in the west, is only available in Portuguese

Life

He was born  in Kanagawa Prefecture, in what is now a part of Yokohama. Because of his father's failed business, he had to drop out of primary school to work. When he was 18, after a near-fatal accident working at the Yokohama docks, he moved to Tokyo and became an apprentice in a gold lacquer workshop. Around this time he became interested in comic haiku. He joined a poetry society and started writing comic haiku under the pseudonym "Kijiro".

In 1914, with The Tale of Enoshima, he won first prize in a novel-writing contest sponsored by the publisher Kodansha. He joined the newspaper Maiyu Shimbun in 1921, and in the following year he began publishing serializations, starting with Life of Shinran.

He married Yasu Akazawa in 1923, the year of the Great Kantō earthquake. His experiences in the earthquake strengthened his resolve to make writing his career. In the following years he published stories in various periodicals published by Kodansha, who recognized him as their number one author. He used 19 pen names before settling on Eiji Yoshikawa. He first used this pen name with the serialization of Sword Trouble, Woman Trouble. His name became a household word after Secret Record of Naruto was serialized in the Osaka Mainichi Shimbun; from then on his writing became much more popular.

In the early 1930s, his writing became introspective, reflecting growing troubles in his personal life. But in 1935, with the serialization of Musashi, about famed swordsman Miyamoto Musashi, in the Asahi Shimbun, his writing settled firmly into the genre of historical adventure fiction.

Upon the outbreak of war with China in 1937 the Asahi Shimbun sent him into the field as a special correspondent. At this time he divorced Yasu Akazawa and married Fumiko Ikedo. During the war he continued writing novels, and became more influenced by Chinese culture. Among the works of this period are Taiko and his re-telling of the Romance of the Three Kingdoms.

At the end of the war he stopped writing for a while and settled down to enjoy a quiet retirement in Yoshino (present-day Oumeshi) on the outskirts of Tokyo, but by 1947 he had started writing again. His post-war works include New Tale of the Heike, published in the Asahi Weekly (1950), and A Private Record of the Pacific War (1958).

On September 7, 1962, he died from cancer-related complications.

English translations
Four of his books have been translated into English. They are:

Miyamoto Musashi, translated as Musashi
Translated by Charles S. Terry
(1981) Musashi. New York: HarperCollins.  (cloth)
(1989) Musashi Book I: The Way of the Samurai. New York: Pocket Books.  (paper)
(1989) Musashi Book II: The Art of War. New York: Pocket Books  (paper)
(1989) Musashi Book III: The Way of the Sword. New York: Pocket Books.  (paper)
(1989) Musashi Book IV: The Bushido Code. New York: Pocket Books.  (paper)
(1989) Musashi Book V: The Way of Life and Death. New York: Pocket Books.  (paper)
(1995) Musashi. Tokyo: Kodansha International.  (cloth)

Taiko ki, translated as Taiko: An Epic Novel of War and Glory in Feudal Japan
Translated by William Scott Wilson
(1992) Taiko: An Epic Novel of War and Glory in Feudal Japan. Tokyo: Kodansha.  (cloth)
(2000) Taiko: An Epic Novel of War and Glory in Feudal Japan. Tokyo: Kodansha.  (cloth)

Shin Heike monogatari, translated as The Heike Story: A Modern Translation of the Classic Tale of Love and War
Translated by Fuki Wooyenaka Uramatsu
(1956) The Heike Story: A Modern Translation of the Classic Tale of Love and War. New York: Alfred A. Knopf. ASIN B0007BR0W8 (cloth)
(1981) The Heike Story: A Modern Translation of the Classic Tale of Love and War. Tokyo: Tuttle Publishing.  (paper)
(2002) The Heike Story: A Modern Translation of the Classic Tale of Love and War. Tokyo: Tuttle Publishing.  (paper)

Wasurenokori no ki, translated as Fragments of a Past: A Memoir
Translated by Edwin McClellan

 ;  (paper)

Works in print in Japanese
The Japanese publisher Kodansha currently publishes an 80-volume series: Yoshikawa Eiji Rekishi Jidai Bunko (吉川英治歴史時代文庫), or Eiji Yoshikawa's Historical Fiction in Paperback. Kodansha numbers the series from 1 to 80.
 1 —  (Kennan Jonan) – Sword Trouble, Woman Trouble
 2–4 (in three volumes) –  (Naruto Hichō) – Secret Record of Naruto
 5–7 (in three volumes) –  (Edo Sangoku-shi) – The Three Kingdoms of Edo
 8 –  (Kankan Mushi wa Utau) – "The rustbeater (dockworker that beats rust off steamships, boilers etc) sings" and other stories
 9 –  (Rougoku no Hanayome) – The Jail Bride
 10 –  (Matsu no Rohachi) – Rohachi of the Pines
 11–13 (in three volumes) –  (Shinran)
 14–21 (in eight volumes) –  (Miyamoto Musashi)
 22–32 (in eleven volumes) –  (Shinsho Taiko ki) – paperback Life of the Taiko
 33–40 (in eight volumes) –  (Sangoku shi) – Romance of the Three Kingdoms
 41–42 (in two volumes) –  (Minamoto no Yoritomo)
 43 –  (Uesugi Kenshin)
 44 –  (Kuroda Josui)
 45 –  (Ooka Echizen)
 46 –  (Taira no Masakado)
 47–62 (in sixteen volumes) –  (Shin Heike monogatari) – New Tale of the Heike
 63–70 (in eight volumes) –  (Shihon Taihei ki) – Private Record of the Pacific War
 71–74 (in four volumes) –  (Shin Suikoden) – New Tales from the Water Margin
 75 –  (Jirokichi Goshi) – "Jirokichi Goshi" and other stories
 76 –  (Yagyu Tsukikage sho) – "The Papers of Yagyu Tsukikage" and other stories
 77 –  (Wasurenokori no ki) – Record of Things Left Unforgotten
 78–80 (in three volumes) –  (Shinshu Tenma Kyo)

Notes

References
 Yoshikawa Eiji (2006). In Encyclopædia Britannica. Retrieved June 4, 2006.

External links
The Yoshikawa Eiji House and Museum website (in Japanese)

1892 births
1962 deaths
Japanese historical novelists
Writers of historical fiction set in the early modern period
Writers of historical fiction set in the Middle Ages
People from Yokohama
Winner of Kodansha Manga Award (General)
Recipients of the Order of Culture
Japanese racehorse owners and breeders
20th-century Japanese novelists
Deaths from cancer in Japan
People related to Jōdo Shinshū